The National Fire Agency of the Ministry of the Interior (NFA) is a statutory agency under the Ministry of the Interior of the Republic of China (Taiwan). The agency provides emergency medical, fire prevention, firefighting and disaster rescue service as well as protecting civilian lives, property and safety. The agency is administered by the Director General which reports to the Minister for Interior. The current Director General is Chi-Tang Yeh.

History
The National Fire Agency was established in March 1995.  Prior to that, fire departments in Taiwan were part of the National Police Agency.

Departmental structure

The National Fire Agency is composed of the following divisions:
Planning Division
Disaster Management Division
Fire Prevention Division
Hazardous Aerial Management Division
Disaster Rescue Division
Emergency medical Service Division
Fire Investigation Division
Training & Education Division
Civilian Coordination Division
Rescue Command Center
Secretariat
Personnel Office
Accounting Office
Civil Service Ethics Office

Mission units
Information Office
Inspector Office

External Units
Special Search and Rescue Team
Training Center

Internal Units
Keelung Harbor Fire Brigade
Taichung Harbor Fire Brigade
Kaohsiung Harbor Fire Brigade
Hualien Harbor Fire Brigade

Local Fire Departments in Taiwan

Transportation
The agency headquarters is accessible within walking distance from Dapinglin Station of the Taipei Metro.

Rank insignia

See also
 Ministry of the Interior (Taiwan)
 Fire department
 List of fire departments

References

1995 establishments in Taiwan
Executive Yuan
Fire departments
Firefighting in Taiwan
Organizations based in New Taipei
Government agencies established in 1995